Onesmus Muthomi Njuki is a Kenyan politician. He is the second and Incumbent Governor of Tharaka Nithi County in Kenya after being elected on the UDA ticket in the 2022 Kenyan general election. Before being elected Governor, he served as the Chuka/Igambang'ombe Member of Parliament from 2013-2017.

Education

Basic Education 
After he completed his early education, he attended Chuka Boys for O level and later joined Lenana School where he completed his A levels.

Higher Education 
H.E. Muthomi Njuki went to Kenyatta University where he did a bachelor's degree in Education and Botany and Zoology.

He later proceeded to do a master's degree in Entrepreneurship and Innovations Management at the University of Nairobi.

Hobbies/ Special Interests 
He is very passionate in Entrepreneurship where he has mentored a lot of young people in business acumen.

He enjoys outdoor games and sports such as rugby which he coached.

Career life 

Before venturing into politics and business, Muthomi Njuki was a High School teacher in Kitui.

Today, Njuki is an Entrepreneur who has worked with various Telecommunications Big Brands in Africa as a partner to offer various products, services and solutions.

The companies include Safaricom Limited and Airtel Limited, which offer telecommunications solutions.

He has also been associated with Generations Electronics which grew from Generations Video Library that he operated earlier.

Political career 
Entry Into Politics (As a Member of Parliament)

H.E. Muthomi Njuki was elected to the 11th Parliament on an Alliance Party of Kenya (APK) party Jubilee Coalition in 2013.

He was a Member of Parliament for Chuka Igamba Ng’ombe Constituency in Tharaka Nithi County from 2013 to 2017.

In the National Assembly he was a member of Public Investments Committee and also a member of Departmental Committee on Energy, Communications and Information from March 2013.

Achievements as a Member of Parliament 

Some of the key achievements include:

1.     Tarmacking of Chuka Town and its environs. He championed tarmacking of over 50 km of constituency roads including Chuka-Kiangondu-Ndagani , then Kirubia, Kambandi and Weru.

Initially, the constituency had no tarmac, except for the passing highway.

2.     Construction of the Chuka/ Igamba ng’ombe constituency executive office block

3.    Construction of a modern open-air market that traders can engage and trade

4.    Establishment of Muthomi Njuki Foundation which supports the underprivileged in the society to enable them go through the education system

5. Construction of the first national stadium (Kirubia Stadium) in Tharaka Nithi County.

Election as Governor, Year, Key Manifesto points, for the county 
H.E. Muthomi Njuki serves as the Governor of Tharaka Nithi County after winning the 2017 general election on 8 August.

He was later sworn in on the 18th of August 2017

In the Governor's manifesto the three key principles to guide in achievement of the vision is to:1.     To listen carefully to what the people truly want and what their priorities are.

2.    Ensure equitable distribution of resources and opportunities across the county. All parts of Tharaka Nithi must feel they are part of the journey we are embarking on to greatness. The diversity, either in cultural or geographical, must remain a source of strength, not a weakness

3.    Work in harmony with the national leadership, recognizing that its not competition, but play complementary roles in the service of Tharaka Nithi people

Achievements as a Governor 

Some of the key achievements in the first year as a Governor include:

1.     Construction of the Governor's executive office block for temporary use ahead of completion of the main Governor's office.

2.    Implementation of various water projects across the county that have facilitated clean water access to the residents

3.    Implementation of various roads, upgrade of town roads and construction of bridges to create accessibility

4.    Signing of performance contracts with the County Executive Members to ensure efficiency in delivery of services

5.    Signing of Memorandums of Understanding with various institutions such as The University of Nairobi, The Kenya Red Cross, Kenya Rural Electrification Authority, Kenya Literature Bureau just to mention a few to collaborate and partner in various engagements to offer service delivery to the county residents

6.    Ongoing construction of various institution blocks to aid in improvement of services. They include; ECDE classes, Stadiums, Agriculture Institutions etc.

7.    Ongoing expansion of county referral hospital and modernization of the hospital structure and equipment. The hospital has also automated the information management system to create efficiency

8.    Electrification of various markets and villages to ensure we light up the county

References

 https://www.nation.co.ke/counties/tharaka-nithi/Uhuru-Stadium-Tharaka-Nithi/3370192-3984324-e632lxz/index.html

1968 births
Living people
County Governors of Kenya
Jubilee Party politicians
Meru people
Alumni of Lenana School
Kenyatta University alumni
University of Nairobi alumni
People from Tharaka-Nithi County